Maia Pearl Szalavitz (born March 29, 1965) is an American reporter and author who focuses on science, public policy and addiction treatment.

Early life and education
Maia Szalavitz was born March 29, 1965. She was raised in upstate New York. She graduated from Monroe-Woodbury High School in 1983 and attended Columbia University. She graduated cum laude from Brooklyn College.

Career

Szalavitz is best known as the author of Help at Any Cost: How the Troubled-Teen Industry Cons Parents and Hurts Kids, a 2006 exposé documenting abuse in the insufficiently regulated troubled-teen treatment industry. She has written many other books including Born for Love: Why Empathy is Essential – and Endangered (Morrow, 2010) and The Boy Who Was Raised as a Dog (Basic, 2006), both coauthored with Dr. Bruce D. Perry; and co-authored Recovery Options: The Complete Guide with Dr. Joseph Volpicelli.

Paul Raeburn at Knight Science Journalism at MIT called her "...the best writer I know of on addiction and related issues."

Szalavitz blogs for the Huffington Post and has written for the New York Times, the Washington Post, Newsday, New York magazine, New Scientist, Newsweek, Elle, Salon, Redbook and other major publications. She has also worked in television – first as Associate Producer and then Segment Producer for the PBS Charlie Rose Show, then on several documentaries including a Barbara Walters' AIDS special for ABC, and as Series Researcher and Associate Producer for the PBS documentary series Moyers on Addiction: Close to Home.

Szalavitz is an investigative reporter for Time magazine, and since 2004 has been a senior fellow at George Mason University's media watchdog group  Statistical Assessment Service.

In 2009, Szalavitz partnered with Brent W. Jeffs and released Lost Boy, a biography of Jeffs' life in the Fundamentalist Church of Jesus Christ of Latter Day Saints.

In March 2016, her book Unbroken Brain: A Revolutionary New Way of Understanding Addiction was published by St. Martin's Press. Szalavitz was a 2015 Soros Media fellow, which supported her in writing this book.

Awards and honors
She has been awarded the American Psychological Association's Division 50 Award for Contributions to the Addictions, the Media Award from the American College of Neuropsychopharmacology and the Drug Policy Alliance's  2005 Edward M. Brecher Award for Achievement.

References

External links

 'Help At Any Cost'

1965 births
Living people
American non-fiction writers
American women writers
American women journalists
Journalists from New York City
Writers on addiction
Brooklyn College alumni
21st-century American women